Pokrovka is a village in the Talas Region of Kyrgyzstan. It is the administrative seat of Manas District. Its population was 8,522 in 2021.

Population

References

Populated places in Talas Region